The 2022 FIBA Under-18 Women's Americas Championship was an international under-18 basketball tournament that was held from 13 to 19 June 2022 in Buenos Aires, Argentina. The thirteenth edition of the biennial competition, this was also the qualifying tournament for FIBA Americas in the 2023 FIBA Under-19 Women's Basketball World Cup in Spain.

Host selection
On 9 May 2022, FIBA Americas decided to grant Argentina the hosting rights for the FIBA U18 Americas Women's Championship. The tournament will take place from June 13 to 19 at the Estadio Obras Sanitarias in the city of Buenos Aires. The tournament was played again after the last edition held in 2018, since the 2020 event was canceled due to the COVID-19 pandemic. This was the third time that Argentina hosted the continental under-18 tournament, and the second time for Buenos Aires after hosting the event in 2008.

Participating teams 
 North America:
 
  
 Central America/Caribbean: (2021 Central American/Caribbean U17 Women's Championship - 14–18 July 2021)
 
  
 
 South America: (2022 South American U18 Women's Championship in Buenos Aires, Argentina - 3–9 April 2022)
 
  (Hosts)

Preliminary round
The draw was held on 16 May 2022 in FIBA Americas Regional Office in San Juan, Puerto Rico.

All times are local (UTC-3).

Group A

Group B

Knockout stage

Bracket

Quarterfinals

5–8th place semifinals

Semifinals

Seventh place game

Fifth place game

Third place game

Final

Statistics and awards

Awards

All Tournament Team
 Kira Rice
 Ana Paula de Oliveira
 T’yana Todd
 Cotie McMahon
 Lara Tribouley

Final ranking

References

FIBA Americas Under-18 Championship for Women
2022 in women's basketball
2021–22 in North American basketball
2021–22 in South American basketball
June 2022 sports events in Argentina
2022 in Argentine sport
International women's basketball competitions hosted by Argentina
Sports competitions in Buenos Aires